Jesper Bank (born 6 April 1957 in Fredericia) is a Danish sailor and Olympic champion. 
He received a bronze medal in the Soling Class at the 1988 Summer Olympics in Seoul.

He won a gold medal at the 1992 Summer Olympics in Barcelona, and again at the 2000 Summer Olympics in Sydney.

This makes Jesper Bank among the most winning regatta and match-race sailors seen.
Between 1978 (nationally) relatively 1987 (internationally) and 2000 achieved he to be:
 Twice Olympic champion and additional one time bronze medallist.
 8 times World Champion and additional 5 times medallist.
 3 times European Champion and additional 3 times medallist.
 Scandinavian Champion and additional two times bronze medallist.
 9 times national Danish Champion and additional a single Bronze medal.

The international and some national results though as skipper in 3-crew boat classes.

He sailed for Victory Challenge in the 2003 Louis Vuitton Cup and United Internet Team Germany in the 2007 Louis Vuitton Cup.

After his career in sports have he been producing sails and have widely been used as sailing advisor by teams on all levels as well as single sailors.

References

External links
 
 
 

1957 births
Living people
Danish male sailors (sport)
Dragon class sailors
Olympic sailors of Denmark
Olympic gold medalists for Denmark
Olympic bronze medalists for Denmark
Olympic medalists in sailing
Sailors at the 1984 Summer Olympics – Soling
Sailors at the 1988 Summer Olympics – Soling
Sailors at the 1992 Summer Olympics – Soling
Sailors at the 2000 Summer Olympics – Soling
Medalists at the 2000 Summer Olympics
Medalists at the 1992 Summer Olympics
Medalists at the 1988 Summer Olympics
H-boat class sailors
2007 America's Cup sailors
2003 America's Cup sailors
European Champions Soling
People from Fredericia
Sportspeople from the Region of Southern Denmark